Simon Alan Reeve (born 21 July 1972) is a British author, journalist, adventurer, documentary filmmaker and television presenter. Reeve divides his home time between London and Devon. He makes global travel and environmental documentaries, and has written books on international terrorism, modern history, and his adventures.  Amongst his many television programmes and series for the BBC, Reeve has presented Holidays in the Danger Zone: Places That Don't Exist, Tropic of Cancer, Equator and Tropic of Capricorn.

Reeve is the New York Times best-selling author of The New Jackals (1998), One Day in September (2005) and Tropic of Capricorn (2007). He has received a One World Broadcasting Trust Award and the 2012 Ness Award from the Royal Geographical Society (RGS).

Early life 
Reeve was born and raised in Acton, West London, by his parents, Alan Reeve, who was a teacher, and Cindy Reeve, who was an occupational therapist and worked in restaurants. He has a younger brother called James. He attended the Twyford Church of England High School.

Reeve had a ‘tense and sometimes violent relationship’ with his father when he was growing up. He said that in his house ‘there was endless shouting, lots of crashing and banging, and a few times it was so violent we or our neighbours called the police to come and break us up’.

From the age of 14, he required counselling due to behavioural problems, such as starting fires, vandalism, and setting off an explosive at the Ealing Broadway Centre. He ended up carrying a knife by the time he was 12 or 13.

He described his final months at school being "a bit of a blur". He left school with one GCSE, living on benefits, and with mental health problems. At the age of 17, Reeve stated he was even a "whisker away" from suicide. He found himself standing on the edge of a bridge, unable to "face existence", but something made him climb back.

Career 

After leaving school, he took a series of jobs, including working in a supermarket, a jewellery shop and a charity shop. Eventually, aged 18, he ended up as a post boy at the British newspaper The Sunday Times.

After starting at The Sunday Times as a post boy, he then worked at the cuttings library, before helping a team of investigative journalists, and by night he was working on investigations into nuclear and weapons smuggling, and terrorism. One of his formative roles at 18 was to follow a weapons dealer from Gatwick Airport.

At the age of 21, citing his "fearlessness of youth", Reeve was investigating the 1993 World Trade Center bombing. He authored a book The New Jackals: Ramzi Yousef, Osama bin Laden and the Future of Terrorism; eventually published in 1998, it was the first book on Osama bin Laden, Ramzi Yousef, and al-Qaeda; this became a New York Times bestseller. Classified documents obtained by the author, with uninhibited access from the likes of the FBI and the CIA, detailed the existence, development, and aims of al-Qaeda, yet his book warning of an apocalyptic act by terrorists went unnoticed.

After the attacks of 11 September 2001 in the United States of America, Reeve became a media expert on terrorism on the basis of his book. The BBC initially wanted him to make a programme involving infiltrating al-Qaeda. He eventually began making travel documentaries. Tom Hall, travel editor for Lonely Planet publications, has described Reeve's travel documentaries as "the best travel television programmes of the past five years".

In January 2013, Reeve appeared in a charity special of The Great British Bake Off.

6 September 2018 saw the release of Reeve's autobiography called Step by Step: The Life in My Journeys; covering his humble beginnings to successful author and television presenter.

After catching malaria on a journey around the Equator, Reeve became an ambassador for the Malaria Awareness Campaign. Along with Sir David Attenborough and other conservation specialists, Reeve is a member of the Council of Ambassadors for WWF, one of the world's leading environmental organisations.

In 2020, Reeve was commissioned to present his first UK based travel show Cornwall With Simon Reeve, which was ordered by BBC Two alongside Incredible Journeys With Simon Reeve. The latter show is due to be a 'look back' programme similar to Joanna Lumley's Unseen Adventures or Michael Palin: Travels of a Lifetime (a show which featured both Reeve and Lumley talking about the ex-Monty Python actor's travels). In 2020 it was announced that Reeve would serve as Executive Producer for The Balkans (2020), an internet television series distributed by Amazon Prime.

Television
2003 – Holidays in the Danger Zone: Meet the Stans
2004 – House of Saud (also broadcast as: Saudi: The Family in Crisis)
2005 – Holidays in the Danger Zone: Places That Don't Exist
2006 – Equator (Silver Award winner, 2007 Wanderlust Travel Awards)
2008 – Tropic of Capricorn
2009 – Explore
2010 – Tropic of Cancer
2012 – Indian Ocean
2012 – Cuba with Simon Reeve
2013 – Australia with Simon Reeve
2013 – Pilgrimage with Simon Reeve
2014 – Tea Trail/Coffee Trail with Simon Reeve
2014 – Sacred Rivers with Simon Reeve
2015 – Caribbean with Simon Reeve
2015 – Ireland with Simon Reeve
2016 – Greece with Simon Reeve
2017 – Turkey with Simon Reeve
2017 – Colombia with Simon Reeve
2017 – Russia with Simon Reeve
2018 – Burma with Simon Reeve
2018 – Mediterranean with Simon Reeve
2019 – North Americas with Simon Reeve
2020 – The Balkans
2020 – Cornwall with Simon Reeve
2021 – Incredible Journeys with Simon Reeve
2021 – The Lakes with Simon Reeve
2022 – Simon Reeve's South America

Bibliography

Awards and accolades
2005 – One World Broadcasting Trust (OWBT) Popular Features Award (with Will Daws)
2007 – Wanderlust Travel Awards Silver Award
2012 – Royal Geographical Society (RGS) Ness Award

Personal life
Reeve is married to Anya Reeve (née Courts), a television camerawoman and campaigner who has stood as a Green Party candidate.  The couple have a son called Jake.

References

External links

 – official site
Simon Reeve on Twitter
Simon Reeve biography at Shoot and Scribble
Simon Reeve at YouTube (clips and full programmes)
Simon Reeve interview in Wanderlust magazine

1972 births
Living people
English documentary filmmakers
English explorers
English male journalists
English television presenters
English travel writers
Historians of al-Qaeda
Television personalities from London
Writers from London